Earnest Jackson, Jr. (born December 18, 1959) is an American former professional football player who was a running back in the National Football League (NFL). He was named to the Pro Bowl twice.

Born in Needville, Texas, Jackson graduated from Lamar Consolidated High School before going to Texas A&M University in 1979. In four seasons with the Aggies Jackson had over 2,000 yards from scrimmage and 5 touchdowns.  He led the Southwest Conference in rushing yards per attempt in 1981 with 5.8 yards per carry.  He was drafted in the eighth round of the 1983 NFL Draft by the San Diego Chargers. Jackson played 6 NFL seasons, 1983 and 1984 with the San Diego Chargers where he was a Pro Bowler in 1984 rushing for 1,179 yards and 8 touchdowns.  In 1985, he had another 1,000 yard season this time with the Philadelphia Eagles.  His last three NFL seasons were from 1986 to 1988 with the Pittsburgh Steelers.  In 1986, he was once again a Pro Bowler running for 910 yards and 5 touchdowns. Earnest Jackson ended his career with 4,167 yards on 1059 carries along with 22 touchdowns. He also caught the ball for 695 yards on 87 receptions and 2 touchdowns.

1959 births
Living people
People from Houston
American football running backs
San Diego Chargers players
Philadelphia Eagles players
Pittsburgh Steelers players
American Conference Pro Bowl players
Texas A&M Aggies football players